The canton of Blain is an administrative division of the Loire-Atlantique department, western France. Its borders were modified at the French canton reorganisation which came into effect in March 2015. Its seat is in Blain.

It consists of the following communes:
 
Blain
Bouée
Bouvron
Campbon
La Chapelle-Launay
Cordemais
Le Gâvre
Lavau-sur-Loire
Malville
Prinquiau
Quilly
Saint-Étienne-de-Montluc
Savenay
Le Temple-de-Bretagne

References

Cantons of Loire-Atlantique